The Kogelberg is a range of mountains along the False Bay coast in the Western Cape of South Africa. They form part of the Cape Fold Belt, starting south of the Elgin valley and forming a steep coastal range as far as Kleinmond.

The Kogelberg area has the steepest and highest drop directly into the ocean of any southern African coastal stretch.

Ecology

The mountains are made predominantly of Table Mountain Sandstone and form some very rugged terrain, which is extremely rich in fynbos, the native Cape flora. The Elgin Valley's surrounding mountain ranges are considered the hub of the Cape floral kingdom. They contain more plant species than anywhere else in the floral region, and a large section of the mountain range is now protected in the massive Kogelberg Nature Reserve. The unique local vegetation type is classified as Kogelberg Sandstone Fynbos.

The climate is Mediterranean, however much milder than average, due to constant maritime winds blowing off the South Atlantic Ocean. Winters are wet to very wet and cool, with summers being dry, warm and windy. Snow occasionally occurs on the highest peaks. The area is protected within the Kogelberg Biosphere Reserve and comprises a core area of 103 629ha of protected land. The highest mountain is Koeëlberg rising to 1289m above Koeël Bay.

Infrastructure
The R44 route is a scenic ocean drive that follows this section of coastline.

Towns and villages in this region include:
Rooiels
Pringle Bay
Betty's Bay
Kleinmond
Grabouw

See also
 Kogelberg Nature Reserve
 Kogelberg Sandstone Fynbos
 R44 (Western Cape)

External links
 UNESCO - Kogelberg Biosphere Reserve

Mountain ranges of the Western Cape